Gilletts Lake is a lake located in Jackson County in the U.S. state of Michigan.
Persons looking to fish in Gillets Lake should know that expected catches include Bluegill, Channel Catfish, Largemouth Bass, Northern Pike, Rock Bass, Smallmouth Bass, Walleye, and Yellow Perch.

See also
List of lakes in Michigan
School District
Gilletts Lake residents are in East Jackson School District.  
School District

References

https://www.google.com/maps/place/42%C2%B015'48.7%22N+84%C2%B018'46.6%22W/@42.2636854,-84.3128487,17z
https://www.lake-link.com/michigan-lakes/jackson-county/gilletts-lake/22526/

Bodies of water of Jackson County, Michigan
Lakes of Michigan